Tozkoparan Olympic Swimming Pool is an Olympic-size swimming pool in Istanbul, Turkey.

The swimming pool is situated in Cevat Açıkalın Cad., Erdemli Sok. 4, at Tozkoparan neighborhood of Güngören district in Istanbul. Owned by the Ministry of Youth and Sports, it was opened in 2012. The operator is the Turkish Swimming Federation.

The venue has a seating capacity for 1,034 spectators.

The swimming pool is part of a sports complex, which has a 500-seat capacity sports hall for basketball, volleyball and table tennis events.

References

Sports venues in Istanbul
Swimming venues in Turkey
Sports venues completed in 2012
Güngören